Rumex aquaticus is a flowering plant in the knotweed family, Polygonaceae. It is native to temperate Eurasia. It is commonly known as the Western Dock found in aquatic environments.

Identification
Rumex aquaticus can be identified by its upright, reddish stout, large leaves shaped like hearts around the base and smaller leaves around the stalk. It can grow to about 1.8 m (6ft) tall. When flowering, Rumex aquaticus can be identified by its red, pink, and green 3 sepal flowers surrounding the stalk.

Habitat
Rumex aquaticus is native to temperate Eurasia. It is considered a waterside plant due to it needing nutrient rich, watery soil to grow. Examples of where this plant may grow include lakeside, sides of streams and rivers, or any other environment with access to shallow water.

Distribution 
Rumex aquaticus is a hermaphrodite (both male and female) and is pollinated by wind. The seeds require a moist environment for germination but cannot germinate if submerged in water.

References

External links
 
 
 

aquaticus
Flora of Europe
Flora of Asia